Millcreek is a city in Salt Lake County, Utah, United States, and is part of the Salt Lake City Metropolitan Statistical Area. The population as of the 2020 Census was 63,380. Prior to its incorporation on December 28, 2016, Millcreek was a census-designated place (CDP) and township.

History
The first settlers of the Millcreek area in 1848 included Mary Fielding Smith (widow of Hyrum Smith) and her children, including Joseph F. Smith. The area remained essentially rural in character until after World War II. As postwar suburban growth spilled south over the Salt Lake City limits, the area was not annexed by the city and remained unincorporated.

By the 1980s, most of the area now in Millcreek was built out and known by various names, including East Mill Creek, Canyon Rim and Mount Olympus. In the 2000 census, the area was divided among four CDPs, the westernmost of which was designated Millcreek CDP. The population of this CDP was 30,377 at the 2000 census, and had a total area of 4.9 square miles (12.8 km²). Canyon Rim CDP, East Millcreek CDP, and Mount Olympus CDP were consolidated with Millcreek CDP in the 2010 census, doubling its population to 62,139.

Salt Lake County created Millcreek Township in 2002 as an administrative subentity that included the populated CDPs as well as undeveloped Mill Creek Canyon in the Uinta-Wasatch-Cache National Forest immediately to the east. The township was created to give residents of the area more local control over planning and prevent annexations by neighboring cities.

As other communities south of Salt Lake City were incorporated in the 1990s and 2000s, Millcreek remained as the most populous unincorporated area of Salt Lake County. Residents considered a number of options for their future, including incorporation, which would make it the county's fifth-largest city. Amalgamation with neighboring South Salt Lake was also proposed, which would have combined South Salt Lake's commercial and industrial base with Millcreek's heavily residential character, creating a city of over 80,000.

The incorporation of Millcreek was the subject of a contentious 2012 ballot question, which set the boundaries of the proposed city identical to that of Millcreek Township, and asked voters what form of municipal government should be implemented. The initiative failed with only 40 percent of the vote, leaving Millcreek under the jurisdiction of the Salt Lake County Mayor and Council, as are other unincorporated areas of the county.

Despite the failure of the initiative in 2012, the question was put on the ballot again three years later, and Millcreek residents voted for incorporation on November 3, 2015. In the 2016 election, residents voted for a mayor and city council members in advance of incorporation, which was recorded at 9:30 a.m. on December 28, 2016.

A major initiative since incorporation has been planning for a "downtown" or city center that would tie together Millcreek's disparate neighborhoods and provide a focal point and identity for the city. The area around Highland Drive and 3300 South, a central location with an established commercial base, has been designated for this purpose. However, the area is adjacent to Brickyard Plaza, a shopping center Salt Lake City annexed in 1979 but became surrounded by Millcreek when it incorporated. Millcreek officials saw Brickyard Plaza as an obstacle to creating Millcreek's new downtown and sought to overturn the annexation, though it had been uncontested for decades, creating tensions between the two municipalities. The boundary dispute was resolved when Salt Lake City agreed to transfer some property to Millcreek that would allow for a contiguous city center, in exchange for Millcreek giving up any claims to Brickyard Plaza.

Geography
Suburban in character, Millcreek is wedged between Salt Lake City and South Salt Lake on the north and Murray and Holladay on the south. Millcreek residents typically identify with Salt Lake City, which is designated by the U.S. Postal Service as the "default" place name for mailing addresses in the area. However, "Millcreek" is a recognized place name for addresses in the ZIP codes 84106, 84107, 84109, 84117, and 84124. The city is organized into four community councils, Canyon Rim, East Mill Creek, Millcreek, and Mount Olympus, roughly corresponding to the former CDPs.

Climate
This climatic region is typified by large seasonal temperature differences, with warm to hot summers and cold (sometimes severely cold) winters.  According to the Köppen Climate Classification system, Millcreek has a humid continental climate, abbreviated "Dfb" on climate maps.

Demographics

According to estimates from the Kem C. Gardner Policy Institute of the University of Utah, as of 2015, there were 60,119 people in Millcreek. The racial makeup of the county was 83.63% non-Hispanic White, 2.05% Black, 0.89% Native American, 3.82% Asian, 0.86% Pacific Islander, 7.23% Hispanic or Latino of any race, and 1.52% from two or more races.

Notable people
 Nathaniel Baldwin, the inventor of headphones
 Gordon B. Hinckley, late president of the LDS Church and once president of its East Millcreek Stake

References

External links

 
Millcreek ArcGIS Page

 
Populated places established in 2016
Wasatch Front
Cities in Salt Lake County, Utah
Former census-designated places in Utah
Salt Lake City metropolitan area
2016 establishments in Utah